Linda J. Silberman is an American lawyer, currently the Martin Lipton Professor of Law at New York University.

References

Year of birth missing (living people)
Living people
New York University faculty
American lawyers
Place of birth missing (living people)